Šmaver is a small village in the Municipality of Trebnje in eastern Slovenia. The area is part of the historical region of Lower Carniola. The municipality is now included in the Southeast Slovenia Statistical Region.

There are two churches in the area. The settlement gets its name from a 16th-century church dedicated to Saint Maurice (colloquially known as Šmaver). A second church is dedicated to Saint Anne and was a pilgrimage church built in the early 18th century.

References

External links
Šmaver at Geopedia

Populated places in the Municipality of Trebnje